Agai may refer to:
Agai, a big and famous town in Pratapgarh, (Uttarpradesh), India

 Agai, a town in Deoghar, Jharkhand, India
 Agai, a village in Livinallongo del Col di Lana, Veneto, Italy
 Agai, a village in Nyanza Province, Kenya
 Mar Agai, Aramaic for Mar Aggai, the second Bishop of Edessa, Mesopotamia
 Prince Agai of Konda, a sixteenth-century noble of Yugra
 Dillenia pentagyna, a species of tree, and a medicinal extract from that tree (Indian name: Agai)
6
Agai means 'trout' in the language spoken by Northern Paiute Native Americans, and may also refer to:

 The Agai-Ticutta, a tribe of Northern Paiute Native Americans
 Agai Hoop, the Agai-Ticutta name for the Walker River, Nevada
 Agai Pah, the Agai-Ticutta name for Walker Lake (Nevada)
 Agai Pah Hills, a mountain range in Mineral County, Nevada

AGAI may refer to:

 AGAI, the Escherichia coli gene that produces an N-Acetylgalactosamine Isomerase
 Agrostis airoides, a species of grass (USDA code: AGAI)
 al-Gama'a al-Islamiyya, an Egyptian militant Islamist group
 American Gastroenterological Association Institute
 Antano Gustaicio Aviacijos Institutas, the Antanas Gustaitis Aviation Institute, of Vilnius Gediminas Technical University, Lithuania
 Army General Administrative Instruction, of the British army
 Associazione Guide Alpine Italiane, the Association of Italian Alpine Guides, a prominent association of mountain guides

AGAI may also refer to:
 AGAI-MTR, an intergenic region of the Escherichia coli genome thought to produce several proteins

See also

 Aga (disambiguation)
 Agaie, a historical state in present-day Nigeria 
 AGAIG, an acronym for 'As Good As It Gets'
 Agey, a commune in Côte-d'Or, Bourgogne, France 
 Aggai (disambiguation)
 Aggay, a barangay (district) of Bantay, Ilocos Sur, Philippines 
 Agge (disambiguation)
 Aggey (disambiguation)
 Aghai, an Irish pentagraph
 Agi (disambiguation)
 Hagai, variant spelling of Haggai, a saint and minor prophet
Açaí, a plant mainly used for its fruit.